Archibald Turner (1910 - 1990) was a Scottish footballer who played for Partick Thistle, Dumbarton and Kilmarnock.

References

1910 births
1990 deaths
Scottish footballers
Dumbarton F.C. players
Partick Thistle F.C. players
Kilmarnock F.C. players
Scottish Football League players
Association football forwards